St. Michael Fort is fort on the Croatian island of Ugljan.

Sources

External links
 

Castles in Croatia
Buildings and structures in Zadar County
Ugljan